Kigorobya, is a town in the Western Region of Uganda. It is an urban center in the  Hoima District Administration. Kigorobya also refers to a sub-county in Uganda, where the town is located.

Location

The geographical coordinates of Kigorobya are 01°37'05.0"N, 31°18'32.0"E (Latitude:1.618056; Longitude:31.308889).

Population
The population of Kigorobya Town is estimated at 5,420 people, as of September 2018.

See also
 List of cities and towns in Uganda

References

External links
National Population and Housing Census 2014 Area Specific Profiles: Hoima District

Populated places in Western Region, Uganda
Hoima District
Bunyoro sub-region